Erling D. Bjerno (1929–2019) is a Danish composer and organist. He trained as an organist and was for years 1967–1996 employed by Ansgar Church in Aalborg. During the same period he was employed as a teacher at Nordjysk Music.

As a composer, he was partly self-taught. He made his debut in 1961 with his #1 Symphony. Besides teaching music, chamber music, choral works and theater, radio and TV music, he has written symphonies, operas, etc.

He writes in a traditional style, which has not always been well received by the critics.

References
Edition S profile
Erling D. Bjerno profile
Bjerno, Erling D. (1929-) at DVM.nu

Danish composers
Male composers
Danish classical organists
Male classical organists
1929 births
2019 deaths
20th-century organists
20th-century male musicians